David Pearce (born 7 December 1959) is an English former professional footballer who played as a forward in the Football League for Millwall.

References

1959 births
Living people
English footballers
Association football forwards
Millwall F.C. players
Margate F.C. players
Wealdstone F.C. players
Harrow Borough F.C. players
Hayes F.C. players
Barnet F.C. players
Dagenham F.C. players
Kingstonian F.C. players
Sutton United F.C. players
Hampton & Richmond Borough F.C. players
Worthing F.C. players
English Football League players
National League (English football) players
Wokingham Town F.C. players
Chertsey Town F.C. players